Alwin Schroeder (15 June 1855, Neuhaldensleben – 17 October 1928, Boston) was a German-American cellist. He was well known for playing with the Boston Symphony Orchestra (BSO first cellist from 1891 to 1903 and from 1910 to 1912, and section cellist member from 1918 to 1925). He was the cellist of the Kneisel Quartet from 1891 to 1907.

Alwin was the youngest of four sons of Carl Schroeder (Karl Schröder I, 1816–1890 or 1823–1889), the music director in Neuhaldensleben. He had three older brothers that were also musicians: Hermann Schroeder (1843–1909) became a composer and violin professor in Berlin, Germany; Carl Karl Schröder II II (1848–1935) became a cello professor in the Leipzig Conservatory before being appointed as court conductor to the Prince of Sondershausen in 1881; and Franz (born before 1855 – ?) would work as a conductor in St. Petersburg, Russia. Alwin was seven years old when he began his music studies, he received piano lessons from his father and violin lessons from his eldest brother. Later, he studied the piano with J. B. Andre at Ballenstedt and attended the Berlin Hochschule fur Musik, studying violin with De Ahna and music theory with Tappert.

It was during his tenure at the Leipzig Conservatory that he had the idea for a progressively ordered compilation of etudes by various cellists. He published it many years later in the United States as the three-volume and called it 170 Foundation Studies for Violoncello. Among Schroeder’s publications during the Leipzig years were his Neue Tonleiter-Studien and Technische Uebungen for the development of left-hand technique for cellists and his edition of the six solo cello suites by J. S. Bach.

External links
 

1855 births
1928 deaths
German classical cellists
19th-century German musicians